The 2011 Saga gubernatorial election was held on 10 April 2011 to elect the Governor of Saga Prefecture. Incumbent Yasushi Furukawa was re-elected.

Candidates
Yasushi Furukawa – incumbent Governor of Saga Prefecture, age 52
 – Communist Party committee chairman and candidate in the 2007 Saga gubernational election, age 63

Results

References

Saga gubernatorial elections
2011 elections in Japan